Romero Britto (born October 6, 1963) is a Brazilian artist, painter, serigrapher, and sculptor. He combines elements of cubism, pop art, and graffiti painting in his work, using vibrant colors and bold patterns as a visual expression of hope, dreams, and happiness.

Biography
At age 13, Romero Britto realized that he had a passion for creating art, he enjoyed expressing himself through his artwork. Born in Jaboatão dos Guararapes, on the Northeast side of Brazil, Britto lived and grew up in a large family of eight brothers and sisters. He had an innate creativity which allowed Britto to fill his life with images of a bigger and more beautiful world beyond his own at an early age. He painted what he saw and what he imagined on surfaces such as newspapers, cardboard or any scraps that he could find. With an inordinate passion to excel, he prospered academically. However, Britto's artistic nature eventually led him to seek experiences outside his home. In 1983, Britto went to Paris, France where he was introduced to the works of Matisse and Picasso. Britto was encouraged to travel to the United States where Pop Art was flourishing. Britto started selling his artwork to generate money in order to keep doing what he loves. He sold his first artwork to one of his neighbors and eventually people started to encourage him to keep going. At the age of twenty he held his first show at the university of Brazil. Since moving to the United States, Romero Britto has designed the United Nations postal stamps, he created the NFL SuperBowl XLI pre-show with Cirque du Soleil, and sold paintings to many celebrities and politicians. Romero Britto is not only active in the arts, he is also active in politics where he has served as panelist at the World Economic Forum. Romero Britto is one of many artist to be involved with many charities. He is passionate about his many charities and believes art is an important aspect to life.

Political views 

Britto is a conservative. In 2015 he hosted a fundraiser for Republican presidential candidate Jeb Bush at his Miami studio where he unveiled a mural that he and Jeb Bush's wife Columba had painted with the slogan "#AllInForJeb". Previously, Britto held a fundraiser at his gallery for 2012 Republican presidential candidate Mitt Romney. He publicly supports Brazil's president Jair Bolsonaro, and in March 2020 he gifted the president with his own portrait.

Designing a water park 
In 2008, Grapeland Water Park, also known as Black Beard's Beach near Miami, opened. The entire water park was designed by Britto, and it is covered in his artwork.

References
Notes

External links 

“Romero Britto.” Art Business News, July 2008, pp. 8–9. EBSCOhost, https://search-ebscohost-com.bmcc.ezproxy.cuny.edu/login.aspx?direct=true&db=asu&AN=505323372&site=ehost-live&scope=site. 
Official Romero Britto web page
Education & Culture Project "Responsibility Future - Marinas Garden" in Germany
 Romero Britto's "A New Day Project" in Witten
Portrait of Romero Britto from Jörg Nitzsche, Hamburg
 Two Mundos Magazine
 
 Grapeland Water Park website

1963 births
Living people
People from Recife
Brazilian contemporary artists
Brazilian painters
Postmodern artists
Pop artists
Brazilian expatriates in the United States
Artists from Miami
Painters from Florida